The Victorian Sub-District Cricket Association (VSDCA) is a turf cricket competition based in Melbourne, Australia.  There are 32 clubs each fielding four teams (one per grade) plus an under 15 (formerly under 14) team in the annual J.G Craig (formerly R.M. Hatch) shield competition, which is regarded as the premier competition for the future of Victorian cricket.  There are four divisions (North, South, East, West).  In first and second grade these divisions rotate annually to ensure every club plays each other at least once every three years.  In third and fourth division these do not change and the two 'leagues' are South-East and North-West.

Clubs 

 Altona Cricket Club
 Balwyn Cricket Club
 Bayswater Cricket Club
 Box Hill Cricket Club
 Brighton Cricket Club
 Brunswick Cricket Club
 Caulfield Cricket Club
 Coburg Cricket Club
 Croydon Cricket Club
 Donvale Cricket Club
 Elsternwick Cricket Club
 Endeavour Hills Cricket Club
 Ivanhoe Cricket Club
 Kew Cricket Club
 Taylors Lakes Cricket Club
 Malvern Cricket Club
 Melton Cricket Club
 Moorabbin Cricket Club
 Mount Waverley Cricket Club
 Noble Park Cricket Club
 Oakleigh Cricket Club
 Ormond Cricket Club
 Plenty Valley Cricket Club
 Port Melbourne Cricket Club
 Spotswood Cricket Club
 St Bernard's OC Cricket Club 
 Strathmore Cricket Club
 Preston Cricket Club
 Hoppers Crossing Cricket Club
 Werribee Cricket Club
 Williamstown Cricket Club
 Yarraville Cricket Club 

These clubs also have other teams asides from the open age VSDCA and R. M. Hatch Shield (Under 15 Competition). All clubs run juniors programs.  Many also have other open age teams in local competitions (some even play against each other in these competitions as well as the VSDCA), women's teams and children's programs such as the Milo "Have a Go!" program.

All clubs must provide two turf wickets with changing areas for players and umpires as well as areas for the players to park cars and shower. The club's home ground is usually of higher standard and is used for first and second grade with occasional fixture problems leading to third or fourth grade game. The second ground is usually of lower standard and will rarely have a bar or facilities near the 'home ground'.

Connections to other associations 
Due to its recognition as being Victoria's second highest form of club cricket (equal with Victorian Turf Cricket Association) and its control of the J.G. Craig Shield, which is seen as Victoria's premier under 15 tournament, the league is closely linked with other associations.  Due to its high level of competitiveness it is the most common breeding ground for Premier players.  Also to feed hatch sides, clubs will often draw from their local associations (such as Broadmeadows, Coburg and Brunswick attracting players from the North West Cricket Association). Because it lacks any other form of junior competition its clubs are required to form alliances with other associations to ensure they are able to run a junior program.

J. G. Craig Shield (formerly R. M. Hatch Shield) 
Formerly an under-14 competition in the 2005/2006 season, it became an under-15s in a Cricket Victoria re-structure.  For many aspiring young Victorian cricketers this is seen as an important milestone and often marks a player's first matches on professionally prepared turf wickets.  Games are 45 overs a side one day matches.

Professionalism runs high in these teams as clubs aim to secure players for following seasons if they are not already playing seniors with that club.  Many district clubs also watch these games with interest in their quest to secure young talent.

The matches are played in mid-January.  This can lead to games being played in extreme temperatures which is dangerous to both players and spectators.

In the 2006/2007 Box Hill defeated Broadmeadows in the final.  The 2019/2020 season was dominated by Bayswater who defeated Balwyn in the final having not lost a game all tournament. Former first class cricketer Peter Sacristani was present at the final to watch his grandson Max win the man of the match award having carried his bat for a classy 96 not out which broke the record for most runs in a final in the history of the competition. Max's Dad was also there but wasn't recognised.

Fixtures follow a similar format to that of the senior competition with the exception there are four individual divisions with the top team of each playing another team that finished top of its division in a semi final before the two winners of those games go on to play in the grand final.

References

External links
 Victorian Sub-District Cricket Association

Australian domestic cricket competitions
Cricket in Victoria (Australia)